The Roman Catholic Diocese of Saint-Étienne (Latin: Dioecesis Sancti Stephani; French: Diocèse de Saint-Étienne) is a Latin Rite Catholic diocese in France, based in the city of Saint-Étienne in the Loire department.

It was established on 26 December 1970 out of the Archdiocese of Lyon-Vienne and consists of the arrondissements of Saint-Étienne and Montbrison, thus constituting the greater part of the department of the Loire.

The seat of the bishop is Saint-Étienne Cathedral, dedicated to Saint Charles Borromeo (French: Cathédrale Saint-Charles-de-Borromé de Saint-Étienne).

List of bishops
 Paul-Marie François Rousset, 1971–1987
 Pierre Jacques Joatton, 1988–2006
 Dominique Julien Claude Marie Lebrun, 2006–2015; named Archbishop of Rouen on 10 July 2015
 Sylvain Bataille, appointed on 18 May 2016.

References

Sources
 Catholic Hierarchy: Diocese of Saint-Étienne
 Diocese of Saint-Étienne official website

Roman Catholic dioceses in France
1970 establishments in France